Epicorsia mellinalis is a moth in the family Crambidae. It was described by Jacob Hübner in 1818. It is found in South America.

References

Moths described in 1818
Pyraustinae